Lockhart River is a town in the Aboriginal Shire of Lockhart River and a coastal locality split between the Aboriginal Shire of Lockhart River and the Shire of Cook, on the Cape York Peninsula in Queensland, Australia.

From 1924 to 1967 the Lockhart River Mission was run by the Anglican Church.

Geography
Lockhart River is a coastal Aboriginal community situated on the eastern coast of Cape York Peninsula in Queensland, Australia. The population consists mostly of Aboriginal and Torres Strait Islanders, whose ancestors were forcibly moved to the area beginning in 1924.

The locality includes a number of islands off the east coast: Chapman Island, Lloyd Island, Rocky Island, Sherrard Island and Sunter Island (all of which are in the Aboriginal Shire of Lockhart River)

Lockhart River is the northernmost town on the east coast of Australia.

History

Early European history
The river was named by explorer Robert Logan Jack in January 1880, after a close friend, Hugh Lockhart.

Non-Indigenous people first arrived in 1848, when the explorer Edmund Kennedy set up a base camp near the mouth of the Pascoe River at Weymouth Bay. Kennedy left eight men at the camp but by the time they were located by the supply ship, only two remained alive, the other six having died from disease and starvation.

By the 1870s, fishermen with luggers looking for trepang, pearl shell and trochus were in the coastal areas. Miners in search of tin and gold, along with timber cutters, were in the hills around Gordon Creek and the country inland around the Wenlock River.

Lockhart River Mission (1924–1967)
The Anglican Church established a mission at Orchid Point near the Lockhart River in 1924, at a location which had been a centre of a sandalwood trade. Aboriginal people came and were collected from parts of the Cape York Peninsula and placed at the Mission, known as the Lockhart River Mission, Old Lockhart River Mission or just Lockhart Mission. Six months later, the Mission was relocated to Bare Hill, south of Cape Direction. In the 1930s, Lamalama people were forcibly relocated to the mission from the Port Stewart area, but they later returned. In 1939, many people who had earlier been removed from Coen to the mission, returned to the Coen area.

After the Second World War broke out, the European superintendent went on furlough in 1942, and the Aboriginal people were told to go to several bush camps and fend for themselves. After six months, in July 1942, the mission was reopened but with poor resources and lack of funding. Things improved under superintendent John Warby in the 1950s. A cooperative society was created in 1954 by the Rev Alf Clint for the management of the trochus shell industry, until the market failed. New houses were built and a village created on the ocean side.

In 1967, the church handed over the mission to the Queensland Government, who tried to relocate the people to Bamaga. Most of the people refused to go. In 1968–9, the people were relocated from the traditional area of the Uutaalnganu people on the coast to a new site in Kuuku Ya'u country further north and inland from Quintel Beach. This move and the assimilation policy of the new government administration resulted in much discontent and friction.

The Lockhart River Community was given Deed of Grant in Trust (DOGIT) title to the lands in 1987.  Locally elected councillors now provide administration for the Lockhart River DOGIT.

Other 20th-century history

Lockhart State School opened on 1 January 1924.

During World War II, Lockhart River Airport was constructed as a large American bomber base with three airstrips operating. The US bombers flew to Papua New Guinea and were met by their fighter escorts based at Bamaga and Horn Island further north. Many thousands of troops, both US and Australian, passed through as part of their jungle training before being shipped to southeast Asia, and many sorties from the base were flown against Japanese forces during the critical Battle of the Coral Sea, 4–8 May 1942. This jetty has since been removed. Many old bunkers and rusting 44 gallon drums can still be found in bush areas.

Iron Range Post Office opened on 5 November 1936, closed in 1942, reopened in 1950 and was renamed Lockhart River in 1978.

On 7 May 2005, a Fairchild Aircraft Inc. SA227-DC Metro 23 aircraft, registered VH-TFU, with two pilots and 13 passengers, was being operated by Transair on an instrument flight rules regular public transport service from Bamaga to Cairns, with an intermediate stop at Lockhart River, Queensland. At the time of the accident, the crew was conducting an area navigation global navigation satellite system (RNAV (GNSS)) nonprecision approach to runway 12. The aircraft was destroyed by the impact forces and an intense, fuel-fed, post-impact fire. There were no survivors.

On 11 April 2014, the former locality of Lockhart was split into new localities: Iron Range and Lockhart River.

Population
At the 2006 census, Lockhart River had a population of 542, which increased to 642 at the 2011 Census.

Governance
Lockhart River is both a town located in the Aboriginal Shire of Lockhart River and a coastal locality split between the Aboriginal Shire of Lockhart River and the Shire of Cook.

Climate
 
Lockhart River has a tropical savanna climate (Köppen: Aw) bordering on a tropical monsoon climate (Am). There are two distinct seasons based on precipitation, as mean temperatures remain hot to very hot year-round, ranging from 23.6 ºC (74.5 ºF) in July to 28.3 ºC (82.9 ºF) in December. The longer wet season from November to May is hot, humid and rainy; with high dew points making the heat feel oppressive. The shorter dry season from June to October is hot without much precipitation, but the strong influence of the sea keeps the heat muggy, although less uncomfortable than during the wet season.

Population 

A mix of Aboriginal and Torres Strait Islanders live in the community. The population is 650–700, with most being Aboriginal and Torres Strait Islanders. Approximately 30 are contract workers, including teachers, nurses, police, shop employees, council administration, council workshop, carpenters, and plumbers.

The Lockhart River 'local' population consists of five different clan groups: the Wuthathi from the north of the Olive River; the Kuuku Ya'u from Lloyd Bay and Weymouth Bay; the Uutaalnganu from the Lockhart River south to Friendly Point; the Umpila from Friendly Point to the Massey River; and the Kaanju from the inland mountain areas behind the coast.

Most of the population lives in the community town area. There are two 'Outstations'. The first is at 'Old Site' and is normally used only during the dry season when vehicles can drive to that location on a rough inland road. It is sometimes used as a "weekender" by some local families during the calm weather over the Christmas to January period. The second 'Outstation' is at Chili Beach and is normally occupied all year round by the Hobson family group. It remains accessible by road and water most of the time.

A number of smaller communities also exist: Wattle Hills Station, Pascoe River 'Farm', Chili Beach, Packer's Bay and Portland Roads. Wattle Hills Station is located just inside the mouth of the Pascoe River, north of Lockhart River. It is a share arrangement for persons opting out of mainstream society. Approximately 30 persons live in open-plan style houses. This station has its own airstrip and mail service once a week. Some of the houses have telephones connected and all are linked by their own private UHF radio network under the Rural Fires scheme.

Pascoe River 'farm' is located on the banks of the Pascoe River quite some distance inland. Access to the farm is from the main Lockhart River to Archer River road,  from the Lockhart River community. A track leads a further  to the farm. It is occupied by the Fyfe extended family group. Approximately 10 to 15 people live on the farm.

Chili Beach has a number of dwellings squatting along the secluded beaches and headlands. Approximately 10–20 persons live there. Packer's Bay also has a number of open-plan and full residential style houses occupied by persons opting out of mainstream society. Approximately 10 persons live there. Portland Roads community is a standard housing area with some open-plan style houses and no power, water or sewerage facilities. It was predominantly a fishing community until the recent changes to Fisheries Regulations. Many prawn trawlers, cray boats and yachts use this sheltered anchorage. Approximately 10 persons live here.

Education 
Lockhart State School is a government primary and secondary (Early Childhood-12) school for boys and girls at Puchewoo Street. In 2017, the school had an enrolment of 97 students with 14 teachers and 1 non-teaching staff. It includes a special education program.

Amenities
The Lockhart River Aboriginal Shire Council operates an Indigenous Knowledge Centre, which includes a library, on Poucheewee Street.

Notable people
Rosella Namok, artist

See also

 Skytrans Airlines

References

Further reading
 Bora is like Church. (1982). David Thompson. Revised and Reset edition, 1985. Australian Board of Missions, Sydney, N.S.W.
 Thompson, D. (1995) 'Bora Belonga White Man' Missionaries and Aborigines at Lockhart River Mission, Unpublished MA thesis, University of Queensland. (Pdf available from the author)

External links
Lockhart River Aboriginal Shire Council - Official Website
 University of Queensland: Queensland Places: Lockhart River
State of Queensland's Department of Communities webpage "Lockhart River" Accessed 1 August 2009

Towns in Queensland
Populated places in Far North Queensland
Aboriginal communities in Queensland
Queensland in World War II
Shire of Cook
Aboriginal Shire of Lockhart River
Coastline of Queensland
Localities in Queensland